Hongren may refer to:

 Daman Hongren (601- 674), Buddhist teacher
 Hong Ren (1610-1664), Chinese painter